Life Ka Recharge or LKR is an Indian comedy show. The show, hosted jointly by Vikalp Mehta and Mintoo Singh, is set in India and premiered on 13 June 2016 on &tv.

Cast

 Salman Khan - Baber
 Vinod Khanna - Ameen Soni
 Anil Kapoor - Ram Dhakkan
 Madhuri Dixit - Sephora
 Kriti Kharbanda - Monnu Thakur

Bollywood Dancers 
 Shahid Kapoor performed in his song "Dhan Te Nan and Bekhayali" with Kiara and Taapsee Pannu.
 Yo Yo Honey Singh performed on YouTube
 Shahrukh Khan Vs. Sonakshi Sinha gives a dance in the song "Lungi Dance and Bole Chaudiyan".
 Akshay Kumar sings on Soch Na Sake, Kiss Me Baby And Dil Dooba for 100th Anniversary Of His Mother and Father Also.
 Kartik Aaryan makes Gym Appearance on Scanner.
 Ayushmann Khurrana dance on Rum & Whiskey, Pani Da Rang, Saddi Gali, Maana Ke Hum, Titli Trippin, Moh Moh ke, Dard Kaarara and Areh Pyar Kar Le on Someone's Wedding for his request

References

External links
 

Indian comedy television series
Indian drama television series
Hindi-language television shows
2016 Indian television series debuts
&TV original programming
2016 Indian television series endings